The Oahu Swamp hedyleptan moth (Omiodes epicentra) is a species of moth in the family Crambidae that is endemic to Hawaii.

References

Omiodes
Endemic moths of Hawaii
Biota of Oahu
Taxonomy articles created by Polbot